The American Airlines Center (AAC) is a multi-purpose indoor arena located in the Victory Park neighborhood in downtown Dallas, Texas. The arena serves as the home of the Dallas Mavericks of the National Basketball Association and the Dallas Stars of the National Hockey League. The arena is also used for concerts and other live entertainment. It was opened in 2001 at a cost of $420 million.

History and construction
By 1998, the Dallas Mavericks, then owned by H. Ross Perot Jr., and the Dallas Stars were indicating their desire for a new arena to replace the aging and undersized Reunion Arena. Dallas taxpayers approved a new hotel tax and rental car tax to pay for a new arena to cover a portion of the funding, with the two benefiting teams, the Mavericks and the Stars, picking up the remaining costs, including cost overruns. The new arena was to be built just north of Woodall Rodgers Freeway near Interstate 35E on the site of an old power plant.

On March 18, 1999, American Airlines (AA) announced that it would be acquiring the naming rights for the arena for $195 million. AA is headquartered in nearby Fort Worth and is based at Dallas/Fort Worth International Airport. From its opening in 2001 until 2013, the AAC had the then-current AA logo; thereafter the AAC has used the current AA logo.

The first event occurred the next day with an Eagles concert. Outdoors on the plaza before the Eagles concert, Tom Chaffee & the Saturnalia instrumental rock in jazz band played while patrons entered the venue. On the next night, the arena hosted the last show of Michael Flatley's Feet of Flames tour. The first sporting event took place on August 19, 2001, with the Dallas Sidekicks of the World Indoor Soccer League taking on the San Diego Sockers.

The AAC includes a practice court for the Mavericks, who used it for regular practices until 2017 when a separate facility was built in the Dallas Design District near the arena.

The Mavericks' lease on the AAC runs through to 2031, and once it runs out owner Mark Cuban has considered a new arena to replace the AAC.

Design

Principal design work was carried out by the Driehaus Prize winner and New Classical architect David M. Schwarz of Washington D.C. American Airlines Center was designed to be the heart of a new urban, commercial area designed to reinvigorate the city of Dallas called Victory Park. The facility itself features a conservative, traditional design with sweeping brick façades and smooth arches. The interior includes retractable seating, public art and a technological arena. Because of the Quonset hut-like appearance of its roof and the fact that American Airlines holds the naming rights some fans have come to refer to it as "The Hangar".

PNC Plaza
On the south side of the arena, PNC Plaza (formerly called Victory Plaza and AT&T Plaza) serves as the principal entrance into the facility. Designed by artist Athena Tacha in 2000, the plaza provides an open space with fountains flanked by retail and office buildings. With several HD video displays from Daktronics mounted on the side of the arena and office buildings, the plaza is often used for outdoor events and movie showings.

Notable events

Sports
After the Dallas Desperados played their first season in the AAC, they moved to nearby Reunion Arena and played there for their second season. For their third season, they moved back to the AAC, where they played until the league folded.
The AAC hosted the Big 12 Basketball tournament in 2003, 2004 & 2006.
The PBR hosted a Built Ford Tough Series bull riding event at the AAC, annually, between 2005 & 2009.
The American Airlines Center, as well as the then-named American Airlines Arena in Miami, Florida, hosted the 2006 and 2011 NBA Finals, in which the Dallas Mavericks played the Miami Heat in both franchises' first two Finals appearances. The Heat won the 2006 series 4-2, closing out in Dallas, and the Mavericks won the 2011 series 4-2, closing in Miami. Because American Airlines held the rights to both venues in the NBA Finals, these series were nicknamed by some as the "American Airlines series".
Hosted the 55th National Hockey League All-Star Game on January 24, 2007.
Hosted a watch party for the 2020 Stanley Cup Finals between the Dallas Stars and Tampa Bay Lightning. However, the Stars lost to the Lightning in six games. 
 On Saturday June 18, 2011, it played host to Strikeforce: Overeem vs. Werdum.
 UFC 103: Franklin vs. Belfort was held at the Center on September 19, 2009. UFC 171: Hendricks vs. Lawler was held at the Center on March 15, 2014. UFC 185: Pettis vs. dos Anjos was held at the Center on March 14, 2015. UFC 211: Miocic vs. dos Santos 2 was held at the Center on May 13, 2017. UFC 228: Woodley vs. Till was held at the Center on September 8, 2018. UFC 277: Peña vs. Nunes 2 was held at the Center on July 30, 2022.
On September 24, 2016, the arena hosted the Kellogg's Tour of Gymnastics Champions.

American Airlines Center hosted the opening round of round-robin matches of New Japan Pro-Wrestling's G1 Climax series on July 6, 2019.
The arena also hosted the Junior Gold Championships Opening Ceremony. The Junior Gold championships is an annual bowling tournament every July, for the best youth bowlers in the country and in the world.
American Airlines Center hosted first and second round games of the 2006 and 2018 NCAA men's basketball tournaments. For the NCAA women's basketball tournament the American Airlines Center hosted the Finals in 2017 (will host again in 2023), along with the regional semifinals/finals in 2016 and 2011.

Two Mavericks games in early 2022--one against the Timberwolves on March 21 and a playoff against the Golden State Warriors on May 24--had to be delayed when the roof developed a leak.

American Airlines Center has also hosted WWE events as well, including its regular weekly shows Raw and SmackDown, and it's PPV events including Survivor Series 2003, Night of Champions 2008, Hell in a Cell 2010 and 2014, TLC: Tables, Ladders & Chairs (2016), WWE Great Balls of Fire, and NXT Stand & Deliver (2022), the arena also hosted the 2022 WWE Hall of Fame ceremony on April 1, being notable for The Undertaker being inducted and headlining this year's aforementioned event.

In film and TV
The AAC was pictured in The Simpsons episode "The Burns and the Bees" as "Dallas Arena".
On Tuesday, June 21 and Wednesday, June 22, 2011, it played host to the Dallas audition stages in the first season of the Fox singer search program The X Factor.

Other events
On Monday, September 14, 2015, Republican Party presidential candidate Donald Trump held a campaign rally in the arena.
 A rally for then President Donald Trump was held Thursday, October 17, 2019 in the arena.

Other information
Built on and in the shadows of the former Dallas neighborhood of Little Mexico, the beginnings of the Mexican American population in the Dallas area.
A few weeks after the first event, it was found that the glass installed in the bathrooms was not the same as what was originally intended. Many who drove by the arena complained they had a clear view into the restrooms. The glass was quickly changed to the correct type the next week.

References

External links

2001 establishments in Texas
American Airlines
Basketball venues in Texas
Dallas Mavericks venues
Gymnastics venues in the Dallas–Fort Worth metroplex
Indoor ice hockey venues in the United States
Ice hockey venues in Texas
Mixed martial arts venues in Texas
Music venues in Dallas
National Basketball Association venues
National Hockey League venues
Wrestling venues in the Dallas–Fort Worth metroplex
Sports venues completed in 2001
Sports venues in Dallas
David M. Schwarz buildings
Indoor arenas in Texas
Northland Properties
New Classical architecture
Dallas Stars